Epigrimyiini is a tribe of bristle flies in the family Tachinidae.

Genera
Beskia Brauer & von Bergenstamm, 1889
Epigrimyia Townsend, 1891

References

Brachycera tribes
Dexiinae